Roy Oscar "Doc" Miller (February 4, 1883 in Chatham, Ontario – July 31, 1938 in Jersey City, New Jersey) was a Major League Baseball outfielder from -. He played for the Chicago Cubs, Boston Braves, Cincinnati Reds, and Philadelphia Phillies. He was interred in North Bergen's Garden State Crematory. Miller was posthumously inducted into the Canadian Baseball Hall of Fame in 2009.

In 557 games over five seasons, Miller posted a .295 batting average (507-for-1717) with 184 runs, 12 home runs, 237 RBI and 64 stolen bases. He finished his career with a .958 fielding percentage at all three outfield positions.

References

External links

1883 births
1938 deaths
Chicago Cubs players
Baseball people from Ontario
Binghamton Bingoes players
Boston Braves players
Boston Doves players
Boston Rustlers players
Calumet Aristocrats players
Canadian expatriate baseball players in the United States
Cincinnati Reds players
Philadelphia Phillies players
Sportspeople from Chatham-Kent
Major League Baseball outfielders
Major League Baseball players from Canada
Pueblo Indians players
Baseball players from Jersey City, New Jersey
Manchester (minor league baseball) players
Syracuse Stars (minor league baseball) players
Fargo (minor league baseball) players
San Francisco Seals (baseball) players
Canadian Baseball Hall of Fame inductees